The Satellite Award for Best Miniseries is one of the annual Satellite Awards given by the International Press Academy.

In 2016, the IPA merged the television film and miniseries categories as Best Miniseries or Television Film, but the merged category was discontinued the following year.

Winners and nominees

1990s

2000s

2010s

2020s

References

External links	
 Official website

Miniseries